The Cuiabá River (Portuguese: Rio Cuiabá) is a Brazilian river in the western state of Mato Grosso that flows in the Río de la Plata Basin. It is a tributary of the São Lourenço River.

Course

In its upper reaches the Cuiabá River flows through the  Águas do Cuiabá Ecological Station, which was created as a state park in June 2002 as part of an effort to clean up the water of the river, which was polluted with garbage and raw sewage.
At Cuiabá its lower portion enters the Pantanal ecosystem and region, flowing through extensive and important Ramsar Convention protected wetlands for waterfowl, migratory birds, and other wildlife.

The Cuiabá continues southwest and forms part of the eastern border of the Encontro das Águas State Park.
On some maps it is now called the Canabu River.
The Cuiabá / Canabu cuts across the park, where it joins the São Lourenço River, or Pingara River, which also cuts across the park from the east.
After their confluence the subsequent river continues to be named the Cuiabá River on some maps. 
The combined river flows through the Pantanal Matogrossense National Park, and is a tributary of the Paraguay River.

See also
 Río de la Plata Basin
 List of tributaries of the Río de la Plata
 Brazilian Gold Rush#Cuiaba gold Rush

References

Sources

Rivers of Mato Grosso